is the second single by Japanese singer Angela Aki. It was released on January 18, 2006, reached number 9 on the Oricon Daily Charts, and number 13 on the Weekly Chart. It features the Final Fantasy VIII theme song "Eyes on Me" by Faye Wong and "Today", The Smashing Pumpkins cover.

In an Excite Japan interview, Aki reports composer Nobuo Uematsu as saying her version 'shed light on "Eyes on Me"'.

Track listing

Charts

References

External links
Official Discography 

Angela Aki songs
2006 singles
Japanese-language songs
Songs written by Angela Aki
2006 songs